Active SETI (Active Search for Extra-Terrestrial Intelligence) is the attempt to send messages to intelligent extraterrestrial life. Active SETI messages are predominantly sent in the form of radio signals. Physical messages like that of the Pioneer plaque may also be considered an active SETI message. Active SETI is also known as METI (Messaging to Extra-Terrestrial Intelligence).

History 
'Active SETI' was a term as early as 2005, though some decades after the term SETI. The term METI was coined in 2006 by Russian scientist Alexander Zaitsev, who proposed a subtle distinction between Active SETI and METI:

{{cquote|The science known as SETI deals with searching for messages from aliens. METI deals with the creation and transmission of messages to aliens. Thus, SETI and METI proponents have quite different perspectives. SETI scientists are in a position to address only the local question “does Active SETI make sense?” In other words, would it be reasonable, for SETI success, to transmit with the object of attracting ETI’s attention? In contrast to Active SETI, METI pursues not a local, but a more global purpose – to overcome the Great Silence in the Universe, bringing to our extraterrestrial neighbors the long-expected annunciation “You are not alone!”'}}

Concern over METI was raised by the science journal Nature in an editorial in October 2006, which commented on a recent meeting of the International Academy of Astronautics SETI study group. The editor said, "It is not obvious that all extraterrestrial civilizations will be benign, or that contact with even a benign one would not have serious repercussions". In the same year, astronomer and science fiction author David Brin expressed similar concerns.

In 2010, Douglas A. Vakoch from SETI Institute, addressed concerns about the validity of Active SETI alone as an experimental science by proposing the integration of Active SETI and Passive SETI programs to engage in a clearly articulated, ongoing, and evolving set of experiments to test various versions of the Zoo Hypothesis, including specific dates at which a first response to messages sent to particular stars could be expected.

On 13 February 2015, scientists including Douglas Vakoch, David Grinspoon, Seth Shostak, and David Brin at an annual meeting of the American Association for the Advancement of Science discussed Active SETI, and whether transmitting a message to possible intelligent extraterrestrials in the Cosmos was a good idea. That same week, a statement was released, signed by many in the SETI community including Berkeley SETI Research Center director Andrew Siemion, advocating that a "worldwide scientific, political and humanitarian discussion must occur before any message is sent".

In July 2015, the Breakthrough Message program was announced. This was an open competition to design a digital message that could be transmitted from Earth to an extraterrestrial civilization, with a US$1,000,000 prize pool. The message was to be "representative of humanity and planet Earth". The program pledged "not to transmit any message until there has been a wide-ranging debate at high levels of science and politics on the risks and rewards of contacting advanced civilizations".

Rationale for METI
In the paper Rationale for METI, transmission of the information into the Cosmos is treated as one of the pressing needs of an advanced civilization. This view is not universally accepted, and it is not agree with by those who are against the transmission of interstellar radio messages, but at the same time are not against SETI searching. Such duality is called the SETI Paradox.

Radio message construction
The lack of an established communications protocol is a challenge for METI. While trying to synthesize and project an Interstellar Radio Message (IRM), the receiving extraterrestrials will (ETs) first encounter a physical phenomenon and, only after that, perceive the information. Initially, a receiving system will detect the radio signal; then the issue of the extraction of the received information and comprehension of the obtained message will arise. Therefore, above all, the constructor of an IRM should be concerned about the ease of signal determination. In other words, the signal should have maximum openness, which is understood here as an antonym of the term security. This branch of signal synthesis is termed anticryptography.

To this end, in 2010, Michael W. Busch created a general-purpose binary language, later used in the Lone Signal project to transmit crowdsourced messages to extraterrestrial intelligence. Busch developed the coding scheme 
and provided Rachel M. Reddick with a test message, in a blind test of decryption. Reddick decoded the entire message after approximately twelve hours of work. This was followed by an attempt to extend the syntax used in the Lone Signal hailing message to communicate in a way that, while neither mathematical nor strictly logical, was nonetheless understandable given the prior definition of terms and concepts in the hailing message.

In addition, characteristics of the radio signal, such as wavelength, type of polarization, and modulation are considered. Over galactic distances, the interstellar medium induces some scintillation effects and artificial modulation of electromagnetic signals. This modulation is higher at lower frequencies and is a function of the sky direction. Over large distances, the depth of the modulation can exceed 100%, making any METI signal very difficult to decode.

Error correction
In METI research, any message must have some redundancy, although the exact amount of redundancy and message formats are still in great dispute. Using ideograms, instead of binary sequence, already offers some improvement against noise resistance. In faxlike transmissions, ideograms are spread on many lines. This increases its resistance against short bursts of noise like radio frequency interference or
interstellar scintillation.

One format approach proposed for interstellar messages was to use the product of two prime numbers to construct an image. Unfortunately, this method works only if all the bits are present. As an example, the message sent by Frank Drake from the Arecibo Observatory in 1974 did not have any feature to support mechanisms to cope with the inevitable noise degradation of the interstellar medium.

Error correction tolerance rates for previous METI messages are 9% (one page) for the 1974 Arecibo Message, 44% (23 separate pages) for the 1999 Evpatoria Message, and 46% (one page, estimated) for the 2003 Evpatoria Message.

Examples
The 1999 Cosmic Call transmission was far from being optimal (from a terrestrial viewpoint) as it was essentially a monochromatic signal spiced with supplementary information. Additionally, the message had a very small modulation index overall, a condition not viewed as being optimal for interstellar communication. Over the 370,967 bits (46,371 bytes) sent, some 314,239 were “1” and 56,768 were “0”—5.54 times as many 1's as 0's. Since frequency-shift keying modulation scheme was used, most of the time the signal was on the “0” frequency. In addition, “0” tended to be sent in long stretches, which appeared as white lines in the message.
Realized projects

The below projects have targeted stars between 17 and 69 light-years from the Earth. The exception is the Arecibo message, which targeted globular cluster M13, approximately 24,000 light-years away. The first interstellar message to reach its destination was the Altair (Morimoto - Hirabayashi) Message, which likely reached its target in 1999.

 The Morse Message (1962)
 Arecibo Message (1974)
 Cosmic Call 1 (1999)
 Teen Age Message (2001)
 Cosmic Call 2 (2003)
 Across the Universe (2008)
 Hello from Earth (2009)
 Wow! Reply (2012)
 Lone Signal (2013)
 A Simple Response to an Elemental Message (2016)

Transmissions
Below is a table of messages sent and target/destination stars, ordered chronologically by date of sending:

Controversy
Whether or not to conduct Active SETI, as well as the tone of any message, is a highly controversial topic. Active SETI has primariy been criticized due to the perceived risk of revealing the location of the Earth to alien civilizations, without some process of prior international consultation. That is, Active SETI does not meet the criteria for informed consent in a mass experiment involving human subjects and, potentially, nonhuman sentient subjects. 

Active SETI is discussed in terms of the ethics of space policy. Issues include whether to send belligerent versus defensive messages, cosmopolitanism, communicative burden, consensus, messaging content, proscriptions on premature messaging, responsibility, and shared values, with concerns that even if successful, humanity could be reduced to a cargo cult. Three key approaches are the "barn door" approach, the precautionary principle, and METI as being prayer-like. Notable among its critics was Stephen Hawking. Hawking, who in his book A Brief History of Time''  suggests that "alerting" extraterrestrial intelligences to our existence is foolhardy, citing humankind's history of treating its own kind harshly in meetings of civilizations with a significant technology gap, e.g., the extermination of Tasmanian aborigines. He suggested, in view of this history, that we "lay low". Scientist and science fiction author David Brin expressed similar concerns. Similarly, Liu Cixin's trilogy of novels The Three Body Problem highlights the potential dangers of METI.

However, some scientists consider these fears about the dangers of METI as panic and irrational superstition; Russian and Soviet radio engineer and astronomer Alexander L. Zaitsev has argued against these concerns. Zaitsev argues that we should consider the risks of not attempting to contact extraterrestrial civilizations, since the knowledge and wisdom an ETI could impart to us would save us from humanity's self-destructive tendencies. Similarly, in a March 2015 essay astronomer Seth Shostak considered the risk and ended by stressing that any danger was hypothetical and that humanity would better off risk contact than "endlesly tremble at the sight of the stars".

Astronomer Jill Tarter also disagrees with Hawking, arguing that aliens developed and long-lived enough to communicate and travel across interstellar distances would have evolved a cooperative and less violent intelligence. She however thinks it is too soon for humans to attempt active SETI and that humans should be more advanced technologically first but keep listening in the meantime.

To lend a quantitative basis to discussions of the risks of transmitting deliberate messages from Earth, the SETI Permanent Study Group of the International Academy of Astronautics adopted in 2007 a new analytical tool, the San Marino Scale. Developed by Prof. Ivan Almar and Prof. H. Paul Shuch, the San Marino Scale evaluates the significance of transmissions from Earth as a function of signal intensity and information content. Its adoption suggests that not all such transmissions are created equal, thus each must be evaluated separately before establishing a blanket international policy regarding Active SETI.

In 2012, Jacob Haqq-Misra, Michael Busch, Sanjoy Som, and Seth Baum argued that while the benefits of radio communication on Earth likely outweigh the potential harms of detection by extraterrestrial watchers, the uncertainty regarding the outcome of contact with extraterrestrial beings creates difficulty in assessing whether or not to engage in long-term and large-scale METI.

In 2015, in the context of the Zoo Hypothesis, biologist João Pedro de Magalhães proposed transmitting an invitation message to any extraterrestrial intelligences watching us already and inviting them to respond, arguing this would not put us in any more danger than we are already if the Zoo Hypothesis is correct.

Douglas Vakoch, president of METI, argues that passive SETI itself is already an endorsement of active SETI, since "If we detect a signal from aliens through a SETI program, there’s no way to prevent a cacophony of responses from Earth."

in the context of potentially detected extraterrestrial activity on Earth, physicist Mark Buchanan argued that humanity needs to determine whether it would be safe or wise to attempt to communicate with extraterrestrials and work on ways to handle such attempts in an organized manner.

Beacon proposals
One proposal for a 10 billion watt interstellar SETI beacon was dismissed by Robert A. Freitas Jr. as being infeasible for a pre-Type I civilization, such as humanity, on the Kardashev scale. However, this 1980s technical argument assumes omni-directional beacons, which may not be the best way to proceed on many technical grounds. Advances in consumer electronics have made possible transmitters that simultaneously transmit many narrow beams, covering the million or so nearest stars but not the spaces between. This multibeam approach can reduce the power and cost to levels that are reasonable with early 21st century Earth technology.

Once civilizations have discovered each other's locations, the energy requirements for maintaining contact and exchanging information can be significantly reduced through the use of highly directional transmission technologies. To this end, a 2018 study estimated a 1-2 megawatt infrared laser focused through a 30-45 meter telescope could be seen from about 20,000 light years away.

See also
 Communication with extraterrestrial intelligence
 
 
 SETI@home
Wow! signal

References

External links

 Interstellar Radio Messages
 ActiveSETI.org 
 active-seti.info
 Making a Case for METI
 Self-Decoding Messages
 Should We Shout Into the Darkness?
 Error Correction Schemes In Active SETI
 The Evpatoria Messages
 Encounter 2001 Message
 
 The Pros and Cons of METI from Centauri Dreams
 
 Lone Signal

Technology in society